Alec Vinci (born 2 October 1999), is an Australian professional footballer who plays as a left back for Central Coast Mariners. He made his professional debut for Central Coast Mariners on 1 August 2018 in an FFA Cup match against Adelaide United.

References

1999 births
Living people
Australian soccer players
Association football defenders
Central Coast Mariners FC players
National Premier Leagues players